Bahakel Communications, Ltd. is an American communications company based in Charlotte, North Carolina, that is wholly owned and operated by the Bahakel family. The company was founded by Cy Bahakel in 1953, who ran it until his death on April 20, 2006 at the age of 87.

Bahakel's broadcasting properties include fourteen radio and television stations in Alabama, Colorado, North Carolina, South Carolina and Tennessee. The group's properties are primarily concentrated on the Southern United States for its television stations, and the Colorado Springs and Chattanooga areas for their radio properties.

Stations
Stations are arranged alphabetically by state and by city of license.

Current stations

Television
Notes:
 (**) - Indicates a station that was built and signed-on by Bahakel Communications.
 (††) - Indicate a station that is owned by SagamoreHill Broadcasting and operated by Bahakel via shared services agreement (SSA).

Radio

Former stations

Television

Radio

References

 
Companies based in North Carolina
Radio broadcasting companies of the United States
Television broadcasting companies of the United States
1953 establishments in North Carolina
American companies established in 1953
1953 establishments in the United States
Mass media companies established in 1953